Stanislav Peredystyi (born 17 September 1989 in Dniprodzerzhynsk, Ukrainian SSR) is a professional Ukrainian football defender who plays for Viktoriya Mykolaivka. He is the product of the Stal Kamianske and Shakhtar Donetsk school systems.

In July 2018 Peredystyi signed for Inhulets.

Stanislav's father Yuriy Petrovych Peredystyi in 1980s played for Metalurh Dniprodzerzhynsk.

References

1989 births
Living people
People from Kamianske
Ukrainian footballers
Ukrainian First League players
FC Stal Kamianske players
FC Shakhtar-3 Donetsk players
FC Kramatorsk players
FC Kolos Zachepylivka players
FC Naftovyk-Ukrnafta Okhtyrka players
SC Dnipro-1 players
FC Inhulets Petrove players
FC VPK-Ahro Shevchenkivka players
FC Viktoriya Mykolaivka players
Association football defenders
Sportspeople from Dnipropetrovsk Oblast